In Greek mythology, Corinthus (Ancient Greek: Κόρινθος Korinthos) may refer to the following personages:

 Corinthus, the eponymous founder of the city of Corinth and the adjacent land. According to the local Corinthian tradition, he was a son of Zeus, but this tradition was not followed elsewhere.

 Corinthus, son of Marathon, who ruled over Corinth. When he died without issue, the Corinthians bestowed the kingdom upon Medea, because her father Aeetes had once ruled over the land before his departure to Colchis.
 Corinthus, father of Sylaea, mother of Sinis with Polypemon.
Corinthus, an Elean prince as son of King Pelops of Pisa and possibly Hippodamia, daughter of King Oenomaus.

Notes

References 

 Apollodorus, The Library with an English Translation by Sir James George Frazer, F.B.A., F.R.S. in 2 Volumes, Cambridge, MA, Harvard University Press; London, William Heinemann Ltd. 1921. . Online version at the Perseus Digital Library. Greek text available from the same website.
Pausanias, Description of Greece with an English Translation by W.H.S. Jones, Litt.D., and H.A. Ormerod, M.A., in 4 Volumes. Cambridge, MA, Harvard University Press; London, William Heinemann Ltd. 1918. . Online version at the Perseus Digital Library
 Pausanias, Graeciae Descriptio. 3 vols. Leipzig, Teubner. 1903.  Greek text available at the Perseus Digital Library.

Kings of Corinth
Kings in Greek mythology
Children of Zeus

Demigods in classical mythology
Corinthian characters in Greek mythology